NIPR as an acronym may refer to:

NIPRNet, the Non-Classified Internet Protocol Router Network, a private IP network owned by the United States Department of Defense that is used to exchange unclassified information
National Institute of Polar Research (Japan), the Japanese research institute for Antarctica
Northern Ireland Publication Resource, now renamed NIPR: the National Collection of Northern Ireland Publications, held at the Linen Hall Library